The Paraguay River (Río Paraguay in Spanish, Rio Paraguai in Portuguese, Ysyry Paraguái in Guarani) is a major river in south-central South America, running through Brazil, Bolivia, Paraguay and Argentina.

Course

The Paraguay's source is south of Diamantino in the Mato Grosso state of Brazil. It follows a generally southwesterly course, passing through the Brazilian city of Cáceres. It then turns in a generally southward direction, flowing through the Pantanal wetlands, the city of Corumbá, then running close to the Brazil-Bolivia border for a short distance in the Brazilian states of Mato Grosso and Mato Grosso do Sul.

From the city of Puerto Bahia Negra, Paraguay, the river forms the border between Paraguay and Brazil, flowing almost due south before the confluence with the Apa River.

The Paraguay makes a long, gentle curve to the south-southeast before resuming a more south-southwesterly course, dividing the country of Paraguay into two distinct halves: the Gran Chaco region to the west, a largely uninhabited semi-arid region; and the eastern forested departments of the country, accounting for some 98% of the country's inhabitants. As such the river is considered perhaps the key geographical feature of the country with which it shares its name.

Some  after flowing through the middle of Paraguay, at the confluence with the Pilcomayo River and passing the Paraguayan capital city, Asunción, the river forms the border with Argentina, flowing generally south-southwesterly for another  before it reaches its end, joining with the Paraná River.

Uses

The Paraguay River is the second major river of the Rio de la Plata Basin, after the Paraná River. Unlike many of the other great rivers of the Rio de la Plata Basin, the Paraguay has not been dammed for hydroelectric power generation; for this reason it is navigable for a considerable distance, second only to the Amazon River in terms of navigable length on the continent. This makes it an important shipping and trade corridor, providing a much-needed link to the Atlantic Ocean for the otherwise landlocked nations of Paraguay and Bolivia. It serves such important cities as Asunción and Concepción in Paraguay and Formosa in Argentina.

The river is also a source of commerce in the form of fishing, and provides irrigation for agriculture along its route. As such it provides a way of life for a number of poor fishermen who live along its banks and make the majority of their income selling fish in local markets, as well as supplying a major source of sustenance for their families. This has created issues in large cities such as Asunción, where poverty-stricken farmers from the country's interior have populated the river's banks in search of an easier lifestyle.  Seasonal flooding of the river's banks sometimes forces many thousands of displaced residents to seek temporary shelter until the waters recede from their homes.  The Paraguayan military has been forced to dedicate land on one of its reserves in the capital to emergency housing for these displaced citizens. The river is a tourist attraction for its beauty.

History
The original inhabitants of the upper Paraguay River were the Guarani peoples.

The Paraguay River was explored in the 16th century by Sebastian Cabot, who at that time, became the first recorded European to discover both the Paraná and Paraguay rivers. For hundreds of years, this river has served as the main route of Paraguay to the outside world.

Since that time, the river has had its vitality and importance, but is used today for a convoy of barges.

Wetland controversy

The Paraguay River is the primary waterway of the  Pantanal wetlands of southern Brazil, northern Paraguay and parts of Bolivia. The Pantanal is the world's largest tropical wetland and is largely dependent upon waters provided by the Paraguay River.

Owing to its importance as a navigable waterway serving Brazil, Argentina, and Paraguay, the river has been the focus of commercial and industrial development. In 1997 the governments of the nations of the La Plata Basin proposed a plan under the Hidrovia Inter-Governmental Commission agency to develop the rivers into an industrial waterway system to help reduce the costs of exporting goods from the area, in particular the soybean crop that the area has embraced. The plan entailed constructing more hydroelectric dams along some of the waterways, along with a massive effort to restructure the navigable waterways—most notably the Paraguay River—through dredging of the waterway, rock removal and channel restructuring.

Studies indicated that the proposed river engineering of the Paraguay would have a devastating impact on the Pantanal wetlands. An effort by the Rios Vivos coalition to educate people on the effects of the project was successful in delaying the project, and the nations involved agreed to reformulate their plan. The final plan is still uncertain, along with the effect it will have on the Pantanal and the ecology of the entire Río de la Plata basin. The controversy over whether or not the project will have a disastrous effect on the local ecology, as well as the potential economic gains, continues to this day.

Water characteristics

The Paraguay River basin includes several distinctive habitats, ranging from very clear waters such as Rio da Prata (pt) near Bonito in the upper part to the sediment-rich Bermejo River in the lower part. The suspended load of the Paraguay River is about  before the inflow of Bermejo, but rises to about  after. Directly after the inflow of Bermejo River, the pH of the Paraguay River may reach up to 8.2. The typical pH of the Paraguay River is 5.8—7.4 in the upper part (defined as the section before the inflow of the first non-Pantanal tributary, the Apa River) and 6.3—7.9 in the lower part.

The peak of the flood season in the Paraguay River (measured at Corumbá) is delayed 4–6 months compared to the peak of the rainy season due to the slow passage of water through the Pantanal wetlands. There are significant temperature variations depending on the season. During the low-water season, the water of the Paraguay River is relatively warm (typically above ) and clouded (Secchi depth typically less than ), but in the flood season it is colder (typically ) and clearer (Secchi depth typically ). The upper part of the Paraguay River is warmer than the lower and generally its temperature does not fall below , although some upper Paraguay tributaries may fall below this.

Fauna

About 80% of the fish species in the river are characiforms (tetras and allies) and siluriforms (catfish). Several of these migrate up the Paraguay River to spawn, including Prochilodus lineatus and Pseudoplatystoma corruscans. Unsurprisingly many species in the river are essentially of Paraná River Basin origin, but the fauna also has a connection with two Amazonian rivers, the Guaporé and Mamoré. While flowing in different directions, the Paraguay, Guaporé and Mamoré all have their source in the same region in central South America. Among the species shared between these are the black phantom tetra, an important fish in the aquarium industry, and the golden dorado, which is important in the fishing industry.

Gallery

See also
 Paraguayan jaguar
 Tributaries of the Río de la Plata
 Gran Chaco people

References

Bibliography
American University Trade and Environment data base (2004). Itaipu Dam.
American University Trade and Environment data base. (1999). Hydrovia Canal Plan and Environment. Available online at http://www.american.edu/TED/hidrovia.htm.
Bascheck, B. and Hegglin, M. (2004). Plata/Paraná River Basin, A Case Study. Swiss Federal Institute for Environmental Science and Technology.
Da Rosa, J. E. (1983). Economics, politics, and hydroelectric power: the Paraná River Basin. Latin American Research Review, VXVIII (3), pp. 77–107.
Elhance, A. P. (1999). Hydropolitics in the 3rd World, Conflict and Cooperation in International River Basins. Washington, D.C.: United States Institute of Peace.
Gleick, P.H., ed. Water in Crisis. A Guide to the World's Fresh Water Resources, New York: Oxford University Press, pp. 13–24.
Kulshreshtha, S.N. (1993). World Water Resources and Regional Vulnerability: Impact of Future Changes. RR-93-10, IIASA, Laxenburg, Austria.
Lammers, O., Moore, D. and Preakle, K. (1994). Considering the Hidrovia: a preliminary report on the status of the proposed Paraguay/Parana waterway project. Working Paper 3. Berkeley, California: International Rivers Network, July.
Transboundary Freshwater Dispute Database (TFDD) (2007). Oregon State University. Available on-line at: http://www.transboundarywaters.orst.edu/
United Nations. (1978). Register of international rivers, Water Supply Management, 2 (1). New York: Pergamon Press.

External links 

 "Case Study of Transboundary Dispute Resolution: the La Plata basin," Aaron T. Wolf and Joshua T. Newton
Drainage Plan Will Devastate S. American Rivers, Groups Say   National Geographic News article, July 31, 2003

 
Paraguay
Paraguay
Paraguay
Paraguay
Paraguay
Rivers of Formosa Province
Brazil–Paraguay border
Argentina–Paraguay border
International rivers of South America
La Plata basin
Tributaries of the Paraná River
Border rivers